Diana most commonly refers to:

 Diana (name), given name (including a list of people with the name)
 Diana (mythology), ancient Roman goddess of the hunt and wild animals; later associated with the Moon
 Diana, Princess of Wales (1961–1997), formerly Lady Diana Spencer, activist, philanthropist, and member of the British royal family

Places and jurisdictions

Africa 
 Diana (see), a town and commune in Souk Ahras Province in north-eastern Algeria
 Diana's Peak, the highest point on the island of Saint Helena
 Diana Region, a region in Madagascar
 Diana Veteranorum, an ancient city, former bishopric and present Latin Catholic titular see in Algeria

Asia 
 Diana, Iraq, a town in Iraqi Kurdistan

Europe 
 Diana (Rozvadov), an almost abandoned settlement in the Czech Republic
 Diana, Silesian Voivodeship, a village in south Poland
 Diana Fortress, an ancient Roman castrum in Serbia
 Diana Park, a small park in Helsinki, Finland
 Diana Strait, a strait in the Kuril Islands, Russia
 Diana, a different Roman fortress in the Serbian city of Golubac

North America 
 Diana, New York, a town in Lewis County, New York, United States
 Diana, Saskatchewan, a ghost town in Canada

Astronomy
 78 Diana, an asteroid
 Diana (crater), a crater on the Moon

Media

Books and comics
 Diana (pastoral romance), a 1559 text by Jorge de Montemayor
 Diana (Sailor Moon), the future daughter of Artemis and Luna, good friends with Pluto and Chibiusa; named for the goddess
 Wonder Woman's real name, despite having more to do with Greek than Roman mythology
 Diana, a British comics series targeted at young girls, published by DC Thomson from 1963 to 1976

Film
 Diana (film), a 2013 British film about Diana, Princess of Wales
 4 Hearts, a 2008 Portuguese film developed under the title Diana
 Diana (Lights Out), a character in the 2013 and 2016 films

Television
 Diana (U.S. TV series), a 1973–1974 sitcom starring Diana Rigg
 Diana (UK TV series), a 1984 drama starring Patsy Kensit and Jenny Seagrove
 "Diana" (Spooks), 2005, final episode of the 4th series of Spooks, concerning the former Princess of Wales

Theatre
 Diana (musical), a 2019 musical based on the life of Princess Diana

Music
 Diana (band), a rock group from Toronto, Canada

Albums
 Diana!, a 1971 Diana Ross TV special, also released as live album
 Diana (album), a 1980 Chic-produced album by Diana Ross

Songs
 "Diana" (Paul Anka song), 1957
 "Diana", a single by Comus from their 1971 album First Utterance
 "Diana", a song by Wayne Shorter from Herbie Hancock's 1977 album Tempest in the Colosseum
 "Diana" (Bryan Adams song), 1984
 "Diana" (One Direction song), 2013
 "Diana" (Pop Smoke song), 2020
 "What Have You Got Planned Tonight, Diana" or just "Diana",  Merle Haggard and The Strangers from the 1976 album The Roots of My Raising

Paintings
 Diana (Vouet), a 1637 painting
 Diana (Renoir painting), an 1867 painting

Sculptures
 Diana (Felderhoff), an 1898 bronze sculpture in Berlin, Germany
 Diana (Wiken), a public art work in Milwaukee, Wisconsin
 Diana (Saint-Gaudens), an 1893 statue, a former New York City landmark
 Diana of Versailles

Technology
 Diana (agricultural machinery), a Greek truck and tractor brand
 Diana (camera), an inexpensive toy box camera popular with art photographers
 DIANA (intermediate language), an IDL-based data structure used in Ada compilers and within the PL/SQL runtime system
 Diana (locomotive), a steam locomotive
 DIANA FEA, a Finite Element Analysis (FEA) solver
 DIANA Mayer & Grammelspacher, a German airgun manufacturer
 Diana Motors Company, a Vintage Era automobile company
 DIANA (DIvisive ANAlysis), a divisive clustering algorithm
 Diana, an NPC (Non-Player Character) in Hypixel's MMORPG gamemode, Skyblock

Other uses
 Diana (ship), a list of ships with the name
 Diana (swimwear), a swimwear manufacturer
 Diana monkey, a West African member of the Old World monkey superfamily or Cercopithecidae
 Democratic Renewal (DIANA), a political party in Greece

See also
 Diana Department Store, a chain of department stores in southern Thailand
 
 Diane (disambiguation)
 Dianism, a form of coitus reservatus which can feature in sex magick